Düz Qırıqlı (also, Düz Qıraqlı, Dyuz-Kyrykhly, and Dyuzkyrykly) is a village and municipality in the Tovuz Rayon of Azerbaijan.  It has a population of 5,808.

Notable natives

 Ganira Pashayeva, Member (MP) of the National Assembly of Azerbaijan for Tovuz Rayon and journalist

References 

Populated places in Tovuz District